The FIDE Grand Swiss Tournament 2019 was a chess tournament that formed part of the qualification cycle for the World Chess Championship 2021. It was played on October 10 to 21 2019, on the Isle of Man. This was the first time that a tournament of this type was used as a qualifying tournament for the Candidates Tournament. 

Wang Hao and Fabiano Caruana shared first place, with Wang Hao winning on tie breaks and thereby qualifying for the 2020–21 Candidates Tournament. Of the players who shared third place, Kirill Alekseenko had the best tie break and became eligible for the Candidates wild card as the next-highest placed non-qualifier, as Caruana had already qualified for the Candidates by virtue of being the runner-up in the previous World Championship. Alekseenko was later selected as the Candidates wild card.

The highest-placed female players were Harika Dronavalli (83rd) and Dinara Saduakassova (85th), with Harika winning the women's trophy on tie breaks.

Format 

The tournament was an 11-round Swiss-system tournament, with 154 players invited, including 100 qualifying by rating. The qualification by rating was based on the average of the 12 rating lists from July 2018 to June 2019. The list of qualifiers (except for those qualifying by continental championships) was published on 10 June 2019.

The time control for the games was:
 Time limit of 100 minutes, + 50 minutes added after move 40, + 15 minutes added after move 60, + 30 second per move increment from move 1.

Tie breaks

In the event of a tie for first, the following tie breaks were applied, in order:

 Average rating of opponents, Cut 1 (that is, after excluding the lowest rated opponent);
 Buchholz Cut 1 method: Average score of opponents, excluding the lowest scoring opponent;
 Buchholz method: Average score of opponents;
 Individual games between tied players;
 Drawing of lots.

Schedule
The first six rounds were played from 10th to 15th of October, and the last five rounds from 17th to 21st of October.

 Round 1: October 10 — 3:00 p.m. (CEST)
 Round 2: October 11 — 3:00 p.m. (CEST)
 Round 3: October 12 — 3:00 p.m. (CEST)
 Round 4: October 13 — 3:00 p.m. (CEST)
 Round 5: October 14 — 3:00 p.m. (CEST)
 Round 6: October 15 — 3:00 p.m. (CEST)
 Rest day: October 16
 Round 7: October 17 — 3:00 p.m. (CEST)
 Round 8: October 18 — 3:00 p.m. (CEST)
 Round 9: October 19 — 3:00 p.m. (CEST)
 Round 10: October 20 — 3:00 p.m. (CEST)
 Round 11: October 21 — 1:30 p.m. (CEST)

Prize money
The prize money was $70,000 for the winner and $10,000 for the best woman.

Participants and results
154 players played in the Grand Swiss. 100 qualified by rating (according to the average of the 12 monthly rating lists from July 2018 to June 2019), 18 qualified by continental championships, and 36 wildcards were chosen by the organizers.

The participants, their FIDE ratings as of October 2019 and the results are listed here (hover over results to see opponents). The "Rank" column takes account of tie breaks.

References

External links
 
 FIDE Chess.com Grand Swiss. FIDE. 2 October 2019.
 Rules for the FIDE Grand Swiss 2019

FIDE Grand Swiss Tournament
Chess in the United Kingdom
2019 in chess
2019 in Manx sport
October 2019 sports events in Europe